Michael "Mickey" Mansell (born 31 August 1973) is a Northern Irish darts player who plays in Professional Darts Corporation (PDC) events.

Career

In October 2010, Mansell reached the semi-finals of a Players Championship in Dublin. A week later, he qualified for the 2011 PDC World Darts Championship after defeating Stephen Byrne to win the Tom Kirby Memorial Irish Matchplay. He was beaten 0–4 in the preliminary round by New Zealand's Preston Ridd.

Mansell qualified for the 2011 PDC Pro Tour as one of four semi-finalists from the third day of the Pro Tour's Q School.

On 2 May 2011, Mansell won his place in the UK Open in June. He finished inside the top 96 after the 8 UK Open qualifiers were held. At the tournament he lost in the last 64 to James Wade 2–9.

He represented Northern Ireland with Brendan Dolan in the 2012 PDC World Cup of Darts and together they reached the quarter-finals, where they were defeated by the Netherlands 0–4, having beaten Denmark in the second round. Mansell had a good season in the new European Tour events by qualifying for three of the five tournaments. He lost in the last 32 of the European Darts Open, and in the last 16 of both the German Darts Championship (beat Jamie Caven and Dean Winstanley, before losing to Wes Newton) and the German Darts Masters (beat Mervyn King and Paul Nicholson, before losing to Adrian Lewis). Mansell played in his first World Grand Prix in October as he was one of the two Irish qualifiers. He was beaten by Paul Nicholson 0–2 in sets, averaging just 64.48 in the event where a double must be hit to start and end every leg.

Mansell qualified for the 2013 World Championship by taking the 14th place of the 16 that were available through the ProTour Order of Merit for the highest non-qualified players. In his second World Championship he lost to 15-time winner Phil Taylor 0–3 in the first round, as Mansell won only one leg during the match and averaged 78.46. Mansell was ranked world number 51 after the tournament. In his second World Cup of Darts with Brendan Dolan the pair were beaten 4–5 in the last 16 by the Croatian duo of Robert Marijanović and Tonči Restović. Mansell reached the quarter-finals of a PDC event for the first time since October 2010 in May at the third Players Championship, but lost 4–6 to Paul Nicholson. Mansell beat Co Stompé and Conan Whitehead to face Michael van Gerwen in the fourth round of the UK Open, which he lost 3–9. Mansell was again a qualifier for the World Grand Prix and had a superb opportunity to achieve the biggest win of his career to date as he had three match darts against world number four Simon Whitlock in the deciding leg of the final set but missed them all. Mansell later revealed how this match impacted his darts for the subsequent year ahead as every time he played it was on his mind. At the Dutch Darts Masters he beat Tonči Restović and Gino Vos, before losing 6–4 to Kim Huybrechts in the third round.

Mansell beat Ben Burton and Dean Stewart to reach the third round of the 2014 UK Open but there lost 9–1 to James Wade. In June, Mansell and Dolan beat Peter Wright and Robert Thornton from Scotland in the quarter-finals of the World Cup of Darts. In the semis, Dolan edged world number one Michael van Gerwen 4–3, but Mansell lost 4–0 to Van Barneveld to send the match into a deciding doubles game in which the Dutch pair averaged an incredible 117.88 to progress with a 4–0 whitewash. He won his first match at the World Grand Prix in three attempts by eliminating Ian White 2–0 (sets). Mansell then met Gary Anderson in the second round and won the first set, but was ultimately beaten 3–1 after losing nine successive legs.

Mansell suffered a 3–0 loss to Kim Huybrechts in the first round of the 2015 World Championship. Mansell and Dolan met the Netherlands' Van Gerwen and Van Barneveld for the second successive year at the World Cup, this time in the quarter-finals. Dolan lost 4–2 to Van Gerwen, but Mansell defeated Van Barneveld 4–3 meaning a doubles match was required and, just like last year, Northern Ireland were thrashed 4–0. Mansell qualified for four European Tour events and was knocked out in the second round in all of them.

Mansell's four World Cup appearances in a row ended in 2016 after Daryl Gurney overtook him as Northern Ireland's second highest player on the Order of Merit, behind Brendan Dolan. Three last 32 and three last 16 exits saw him qualify for the expanded Players Championship Finals and he lost 6–3 to Kim Huybrechts in the first round.
Mansell dropped out of the top 64 during 2016 and so played in 2017 Q School, where he finished sixth on the Order of Merit to reclaim his PDC place.

Mansell lost his Tour card after season 2021, battling with injuries during that year. Immediately he regained his Tour card in PDC UK Q-School 2022 via UK Q-School Order of Merit, where he placed on 11th place with 6 points.

World Championship results

PDC
 2011: Preliminary round (lost to Preston Ridd 0–4) (legs)
 2013: First round (lost to Phil Taylor 0–3) 
 2015: First round (lost to Kim Huybrechts 0–3)
 2019: First round (lost to Jim Long 1–3)
 2020: First round (lost to Seigo Asada 0–3)
 2021: Second round (lost to Ricky Evans 1–3)
 2023: Second round (lost to Peter Wright 0–3)

Performance timeline

PDC European Tour

References

External links

1986 births
Living people
Darts players from Northern Ireland
Professional Darts Corporation current tour card holders
People from County Tyrone
PDC ranking title winners
PDC World Cup of Darts Northern Irish team